State Highway 108 (SH 108) is a state highway that runs from Strawn to Stephenville.

Route description
SH 108 begins at an intersection with SH 16 in downtown Strawn, and travels east out of town on Housley Street.  The highway turns south in Mingus, where it intersects SH 193.  South of Mingus, the highway intersects and briefly travels east with Interstate 20.  The route then departs to the southeast, where it reaches Stephenville.  The route intersects U.S. Routes 67 and 377 in Stephenville, before reaching its southern terminus at U.S. Route 281 just south of Stephenville.

Route history
SH 108 was originally designated on March 16, 1925 from Thurber to Stephenville, along with an extension southward to Lampasas. On June 22, 1925, a branch to Chalk Mountain was added. On July 13, 1925, SH 108 was extended south to San Antonio, with one section replacing a section of SH 46. On March 8, 1926, SH 108 was extended north to Strawn. On June 24, 1931, the section south of Strawn was redesignated as the new state-length SH 66, and the rest was cancelled in exchange of mileage. On July 22, 1932, the section of SH 108 from Stephenville to Strawn was restored. SH 108 has followed the same routing since that time.

State Highway 108A was a spur routing of SH 108 that led from Lampasas east to Temple. The route was designated on March 16, 1925. On March 19, 1930, the route had been renumbered as SH 53 (now US 190).

Major intersections

References

108
Transportation in Erath County, Texas
Transportation in Palo Pinto County, Texas